Presley Chweneyagae (born October 19, 1984 in the North West Province Mafikeng, South Africa) is a South African actor of Tswana origin. He starred in the film Tsotsi, which won the Academy Award for Foreign Language Film at the 78th Academy Awards.  His mother, Agnes Keagile named him after her favourite singer, Elvis Presley. Although he had acted before in plays, Tsotsi was his first feature film. His most recent role is on the South African telenovela, The River as Thuso "Cobrizi" Mokoena.

He has recently been focusing on stage plays and more films. His latest films include More Than Just a Game, State of Violence and Africa United. He is currently doing a play about Solomon Mahlangu, a former MK cadre who was hanged at the age of 22.

Selected filmography
 Tsotsi (2005)
 iNumber Number (2013)
 Zama Zama (2013)
 The Number (2017)
 The River (2018)

References

External links

South African male film actors
1984 births
Living people
South African male stage actors
People from North West (South African province)